Babylonian astronomy was the study or recording of celestial objects during the early history of Mesopotamia.

Babylonian astronomy seemed to have focused on a select group of stars and constellations known as Ziqpu stars. These constellations may have been collected from various earlier sources. The earliest catalogue, Three Stars Each, mentions stars of the Akkadian Empire, of Amurru, of Elam and others.

A numbering system based on sixty was used, a sexagesimal system. This system simplified the calculating and recording of unusually great and small numbers. The modern practices of dividing a circle into 360 degrees, of 60 minutes each, began with the Sumerians.

During the 8th and 7th centuries BC, Babylonian astronomers developed a new empirical approach to astronomy. They began studying and recording their belief system and philosophies dealing with an ideal nature of the universe and began employing an internal logic within their predictive planetary systems. This was an important contribution to astronomy and the philosophy of science, and some modern scholars have thus referred to this novel approach as the first scientific revolution. This approach to astronomy was adopted and further developed in Greek and Hellenistic astrology. Classical Greek and Latin sources frequently use the term Chaldeans for the astronomers of Mesopotamia, who were considered as priest-scribes specializing in astrology and other forms of divination.

Only fragments of Babylonian astronomy have survived, consisting largely of contemporary clay tablets containing astronomical diaries, ephemerides and procedure texts, hence current knowledge of Babylonian planetary theory is in a fragmentary state. Nevertheless, the surviving fragments show that Babylonian astronomy was the first "successful attempt at giving a refined mathematical description of astronomical phenomena" and that "all subsequent varieties of scientific astronomy, in the Hellenistic world, in India, in Islam, and in the West … depend upon Babylonian astronomy in decisive and fundamental ways."

The origins of Western astronomy can be found in Mesopotamia, and all Western efforts in the exact sciences are descendants in direct line from the work of the late Babylonian astronomers.

Old Babylonian astronomy

"Old" Babylonian astronomy was practiced during and after the First Babylonian dynasty (ca. 1830 BC) and before the Neo-Babylonian Empire (ca. 626 BC).

The Babylonians were the first to recognize that astronomical phenomena are periodic and apply mathematics to their predictions. Tablets dating back to the Old Babylonian period document the application of mathematics to the variation in the length of daylight over a solar year. Centuries of Babylonian observations of celestial phenomena were recorded in the series of cuneiform tablets known as the Enûma Anu Enlil—the oldest significant astronomical text that we possess is Tablet 63 of the Enûma Anu Enlil, the Venus tablet of Ammisaduqa, which lists the first and last visible risings of Venus over a period of about 21 years. It is the earliest evidence that planetary phenomena were recognized as periodic.

An object labelled the ivory prism was recovered from the ruins of Nineveh. First presumed to be describing rules to a game, its use was later deciphered to be a unit converter for calculating the movement of celestial bodies and constellations.

Babylonian astronomers developed zodiacal signs. They are made up of the division of the sky into three sets of thirty degrees and the constellations that inhabit each sector.

The MUL.APIN contains catalogues of stars and constellations as well as schemes for predicting heliacal risings and settings of the planets, and lengths of daylight as measured by a water clock, gnomon, shadows, and intercalations. The Babylonian GU text arranges stars in 'strings' that lie along declination circles and thus measure right-ascensions or time intervals, and also employs the stars of the zenith, which are also separated by given right-ascensional differences. There are dozens of cuneiform Mesopotamian texts with real observations of eclipses, mainly from Babylonia.

Planetary theory
The Babylonians were the first civilization known to possess a functional theory of the planets. The oldest surviving planetary astronomical text is the Babylonian Venus tablet of Ammisaduqa, a 7th-century BC copy of a list of observations of the motions of the planet Venus that probably dates as early as the second millennium BC. The Babylonian astrologers also laid the foundations of what would eventually become Western astrology. The Enuma anu enlil, written during the Neo-Assyrian period in the 7th century BC, comprises a list of omens and their relationships with various celestial phenomena including the motions of the planets.

Cosmology
In contrast to the world view presented in Mesopotamian and Assyro-Babylonian literature, particularly in Mesopotamian and Babylonian mythology, very little is known about the cosmology and world view of the ancient Babylonian astrologers and astronomers. This is largely due to the current fragmentary state of Babylonian planetary theory, and also due to Babylonian astronomy being independent from cosmology at the time. Nevertheless, traces of cosmology can be found in Babylonian literature and mythology.

In Babylonian cosmology, the Earth and the heavens were depicted as a "spatial whole, even one of round shape" with references to "the circumference of heaven and earth" and "the totality of heaven and earth". Their worldview was not exactly geocentric either. The idea of geocentrism, where the center of the Earth is the exact center of the universe, did not yet exist in Babylonian cosmology, but was established later by the Greek philosopher Aristotle's On the Heavens. In contrast, Babylonian cosmology suggested that the cosmos revolved around circularly with the heavens and the earth being equal and joined as a whole. The Babylonians and their predecessors, the Sumerians, also believed in a plurality of heavens and earths. This idea dates back to Sumerian incantations of the 2nd millennium BC, which refers to there being seven heavens and seven earths, linked possibly chronologically to the creation by seven generations of gods.

Omens 
It was a common Mesopotamian belief that gods could and did indicate future events to mankind through omens; sometimes through animal entrails, but most often they believed omens could be read through astronomy and astrology. Since omens via the planets were produced without any human action, they were seen as more powerful. But they believed the events these omens foretold were also avoidable. The relationship Mesopotamians had with omens can be seen in the Omen Compendia, a Babylonian text composed starting from the beginning of the second millennium on-wards. It is the primary source text that tells us that ancient Mesopotamians saw omens as preventable. The text also contains information on Sumerian rites to avert evil, or “nam-bur-bi”. A term later adopted by the Akkadians as “namburbu”, roughly, “[the evil] loosening”. The god Ea was the one believed to send the omens. Concerning the severity of omens, eclipses were seen as the most dangerous.

The Enuma Anu Enlil is a series of cuneiform tablets that gives insight on different sky omens Babylonian astronomers observed. Celestial bodies such as the Sun and Moon were given significant power as omens.  Reports from Nineveh and Babylon, circa 2500-670 B.C., show lunar omens observed by the Mesopotamians.  "When the moon disappears, evil will befall the land.  When the moon disappears out of its reckoning, an eclipse will take place".

Astrolabes 
The astrolabes (not to be mistaken for the later astronomical measurement device of the same name) are one of the earliest documented cuneiform tablets that discuss astronomy and date back to the Old Babylonian Kingdom. They are a list of thirty-six stars connected with the months in a year, generally considered to be written between 1800 and 1100 B.C. No complete texts have been found, but there is a modern compilation by Pinches, assembled from texts housed in the British Museum that is considered excellent by other historians who specialize in Babylonian astronomy. Two other texts concerning the astrolabes that should be mentioned are the Brussels and Berlin compilations. They offer similar information to the Pinches anthology, but do contain some differing information from each other.

The thirty-six stars that make up the astrolabes are believed to be derived from the astronomical traditions from three Mesopotamian city-states, Elam, Akkad, and Amurru. The stars followed and possibly charted by these city-states are identical stars to the ones in the astrolabes. Each region had a set of twelve stars it followed, which combined equals the thirty-six stars in the astrolabes. The twelve stars of each region also correspond to the months of the year. The two cuneiform texts that provide the information for this claim are the large star list “K 250” and “K 8067”. Both of these tablets were translated and transcribed by Weidner. During the reign of Hammurabi these three separate traditions were combined. This combining also ushered in a more scientific approach to astronomy as connections to the original three traditions weakened. The increased use of science in astronomy is evidenced by the traditions from these three regions being arranged in accordance to the paths of the stars of Ea, Anu, and Enlil, an astronomical system contained and discussed in the Mul.apin.

MUL.APIN 

MUL.APIN is a collection of two cuneiform tablets (Tablet 1 and Tablet 2) that document aspects of Babylonian astronomy such as the movement of celestial bodies and records of solstices and eclipses. Each tablet is also split into smaller sections called Lists. It was comprised in the general time frame of the astrolabes and Enuma Anu Enlil, evidenced by similar themes, mathematical principles, and occurrences.

Tablet 1 houses information that closely parallels information contained in astrolabe B.  The similarities between Tablet 1 and astrolabe B show that the authors were inspired by the same source for at least some of the information.  There are six lists of stars on this tablet that relate to sixty constellations in charted paths of the three groups of Babylonian star paths, Ea, Anu, and Enlil. there are also additions to the paths of both Anu and Enlil that are not found in astrolabe B.

Relationship of calendar, mathematics and astronomy 
The exploration of the Sun, Moon, and other celestial bodies affected the development of Mesopotamian culture. The study of the sky led to the development of a calendar and advanced mathematics in these societies. The Babylonians were not the first complex society to develop a calendar globally and nearby in North Africa, the Egyptians developed a calendar of their own. The Egyptian calendar was solar based, while the Babylonian calendar was lunar based. A potential blend between the two that has been noted by some historians is the adoption of a crude leap year by the Babylonians after the Egyptians developed one. The Babylonian leap year shares no similarities with the leap year practiced today. It involved the addition of a thirteenth month as a means to re-calibrate the calendar to better match the growing season.

Babylonian priests were the ones responsible for developing new forms of mathematics and did so to better calculate the movements of celestial bodies. One such priest, Nabu-rimanni, is the first documented Babylonian astronomer. He was a priest for the moon god and is credited with writing lunar and eclipse computation tables as well as other elaborate mathematical calculations. The computation tables are organized in seventeen or eighteen tables that document the orbiting speeds of planets and the Moon. His work was later recounted by astronomers during the Seleucid dynasty.

Aurorae 
A team of scientists at the University of Tsukuba studied Assyrian cuneiform tablets, reporting unusual red skies which might be aurorae incidents, caused by geomagnetic storms between 680 and 650 BC.

Neo-Babylonian astronomy
Neo-Babylonian astronomy refers to the astronomy developed by Chaldean astronomers during the Neo-Babylonian, Achaemenid, Seleucid, and Parthian periods of Mesopotamian history. A significant increase in the quality and frequency of Babylonian observations appeared during the reign of Nabonassar (747–734 BC). The systematic records of ominous phenomena in Babylonian astronomical diaries that began at this time allowed for the discovery of a repeating 18-year Saros cycle of lunar eclipses, for example. The Greco-Egyptian astronomer Ptolemy later used Nabonassar's reign to fix the beginning of an era, since he felt that the earliest usable observations began at this time.

The last stages in the development of Babylonian astronomy took place during the time of the Seleucid Empire (323–60 BC). In the 3rd century BC, astronomers began to use "goal-year texts" to predict the motions of the planets. These texts compiled records of past observations to find repeating occurrences of ominous phenomena for each planet. About the same time, or shortly afterwards, astronomers created mathematical models that allowed them to predict these phenomena directly, without consulting records.

Arithmetical and geometrical methods
Though there is a lack of surviving material on Babylonian planetary theory, it appears most of the Chaldean astronomers were concerned mainly with ephemerides and not with theory. It had been thought that most of the predictive Babylonian planetary models that have survived were usually strictly empirical and arithmetical, and usually did not involve geometry, cosmology, or speculative philosophy like that of the later Hellenistic models, though the Babylonian astronomers were concerned with the philosophy dealing with the ideal nature of the early universe. Babylonian procedure texts describe, and ephemerides employ, arithmetical procedures to compute the time and place of significant astronomical events. More recent analysis of previously unpublished cuneiform tablets in the British Museum, dated between 350 and 50 BC, demonstrates that Babylonian astronomers sometimes used geometrical methods, prefiguring the methods of the Oxford Calculators, to describe the motion of Jupiter over time in an abstract mathematical space.

In contrast to Greek astronomy which was dependent upon cosmology, Babylonian astronomy was independent from cosmology. Whereas Greek astronomers expressed "prejudice in favor of circles or spheres rotating with uniform motion", such a preference did not exist for Babylonian astronomers, for whom uniform circular motion was never a requirement for planetary orbits. There is no evidence that the celestial bodies moved in uniform circular motion, or along celestial spheres, in Babylonian astronomy.

Contributions made by the Chaldean astronomers during this period include the discovery of eclipse cycles and saros cycles, and many accurate astronomical observations. For example, they observed that the Sun's motion along the ecliptic was not uniform, though they were unaware of why this was; it is today known that this is due to the Earth moving in an elliptic orbit around the Sun, with the Earth moving swifter when it is nearer to the Sun at perihelion and moving slower when it is farther away at aphelion.

Chaldean astronomers known to have followed this model include Naburimannu (fl. 6th–3rd century BC), Kidinnu (d. 330 BC), Berossus (3rd century BC), and Sudines (fl. 240 BC). They are known to have had a significant influence on the Greek astronomer Hipparchus and the Egyptian astronomer Ptolemy, as well as other Hellenistic astronomers.

Heliocentric astronomy

The only surviving planetary model from among the Chaldean astronomers is that of the Hellenistic Seleucus of Seleucia (b. 190 BC), who supported the Greek Aristarchus of Samos' heliocentric model. Seleucus is known from the writings of Plutarch, Aetius, Strabo, and Muhammad ibn Zakariya al-Razi. The Greek geographer Strabo lists Seleucus as one of the four most influential astronomers, who came from Hellenistic Seleuceia on the Tigris, alongside Kidenas (Kidinnu), Naburianos (Naburimannu), and Sudines. Their works were originally written in the Akkadian language and later translated into Greek. Seleucus, however, was unique among them in that he was the only one known to have supported the heliocentric theory of planetary motion proposed by Aristarchus, where the Earth rotated around its own axis which in turn revolved around the Sun. According to Plutarch, Seleucus even proved the heliocentric system through reasoning, though it is not known what arguments he used.

According to Lucio Russo, his arguments were probably related to the phenomenon of tides. Seleucus correctly theorized that tides were caused by the Moon, although he believed that the interaction was mediated by the Earth's atmosphere. He noted that the tides varied in time and strength in different parts of the world. According to Strabo (1.1.9), Seleucus was the first to state that the tides are due to the attraction of the Moon, and that the height of the tides depends on the Moon's position relative to the Sun.

According to Bartel Leendert van der Waerden, Seleucus may have proved the heliocentric theory by determining the constants of a geometric model for the heliocentric theory and by developing methods to compute planetary positions using this model. He may have used trigonometric methods that were available in his time, as he was a contemporary of Hipparchus.

None of his original writings or Greek translations have survived, though a fragment of his work has survived only in Arabic translation, which was later referred to by the Persian philosopher Muhammad ibn Zakariya al-Razi (865-925).

Babylonian influence on Hellenistic astronomy

Many of the works of ancient Greek and Hellenistic writers (including mathematicians, astronomers, and geographers) have been preserved up to the present time, or some aspects of their work and thought are still known through later references. However, achievements in these fields by earlier ancient Near Eastern civilizations, notably those in Babylonia, were forgotten for a long time. Since the discovery of key archaeological sites in the 19th century, many cuneiform writings on clay tablets have been found, some of them related to astronomy. Most known astronomical tablets have been described by Abraham Sachs and later published by Otto Neugebauer in the Astronomical Cuneiform Texts (ACT).  Herodotus writes that the Greeks learned such aspects of astronomy as the gnomon and the idea of the day being split into two halves of twelve from the Babylonians.  Other sources point to Greek pardegms, a stone with 365-366 holes carved into it to represent the days in a year, from the Babylonians as well.

Since the rediscovery of the Babylonian civilization, it has been theorized that there was significant information exchange between classical and Hellenistic astronomy and Chaldean. The best documented borrowings are those of Hipparchus (2nd century BC) and Claudius Ptolemy (2nd century AD).

Early influence
Some scholars support that the Metonic cycle may have been learned by the Greeks from Babylonian scribes. Meton of Athens, a Greek astronomer of the 5th century BC, developed a lunisolar calendar based on the fact that 19 solar years is about equal to 235 lunar months, a period relation that perhaps was also known to the Babylonians.

In the 4th century BC, Eudoxus of Cnidus wrote a book on the fixed stars. His descriptions of many constellations, especially the twelve signs of the zodiac show similarities to Babylonian. The following century Aristarchus of Samos used an eclipse cycle called the Saros cycle to determine the year length. However, the position that there was an early information exchange between Greeks and Chaldeans are weak inferences; possibly, there had been a stronger information exchange between the two after Alexander the Great established his empire over Persia in the latter part of the 4th century BC.

Influence on Hipparchus and Ptolemy
In 1900, Franz Xaver Kugler demonstrated that Ptolemy had stated in his Almagest IV.2 that Hipparchus improved the values for the Moon's periods known to him from "even more ancient astronomers" by comparing eclipse observations made earlier by "the Chaldeans", and by himself. However Kugler found that the periods that Ptolemy attributes to Hipparchus had already been used in Babylonian ephemerides, specifically the collection of texts nowadays called "System B" (sometimes attributed to Kidinnu). Apparently Hipparchus only confirmed the validity of the periods he learned from the Chaldeans by his newer observations.  Later Greek knowledge of this specific Babylonian theory is confirmed by 2nd-century papyrus, which contains 32 lines of a single column of calculations for the Moon using this same "System B", but written in Greek on papyrus rather than in cuneiform on clay tablets.

It is clear that Hipparchus (and Ptolemy after him) had an essentially complete list of eclipse observations covering many centuries. Most likely these had been compiled from the "diary" tablets: these are clay tablets recording all relevant observations that the Chaldeans routinely made. Preserved examples date from 652 BC to AD 130, but probably the records went back as far as the reign of the Babylonian king Nabonassar: Ptolemy starts his chronology with the first day in the Egyptian calendar of the first year of Nabonassar; i.e., 26 February 747 BC.

This raw material by itself must have been tough to use, and no doubt the Chaldeans themselves compiled extracts of e.g., all observed eclipses (some tablets with a list of all eclipses in a period of time covering a saros have been found). This allowed them to recognise periodic recurrences of events. Among others they used in System B (cf. Almagest IV.2):

223 (synodic) months = 239 returns in anomaly (anomalistic month) = 242 returns in latitude (draconic month).  This is now known as the saros period which is very useful for predicting eclipses.
251 (synodic) months = 269 returns in anomaly
5458 (synodic) months = 5923 returns in latitude
1 synodic month = 29;31:50:08:20 days (sexagesimal; 29.53059413 ... days in decimals = 29 days 12 hours 44 min 3⅓ s) or 29.53 days

The Babylonians expressed all periods in synodic months, probably because they used a lunisolar calendar. Various relations with yearly phenomena led to different values for the length of the year.

Similarly various relations between the periods of the planets were known. The relations that Ptolemy attributes to Hipparchus in Almagest IX.3 had all already been used in predictions found on Babylonian clay tablets.

Other traces of Babylonian practice in Hipparchus' work are
first Greek known to divide the circle in 360 degrees of 60 arc minutes.
first consistent use of the sexagesimal number system.
the use of the unit pechus ("cubit") of about 2° or 2½°.
use of a short period of 248 days = 9 anomalistic months.

Means of transmission
All this knowledge was transferred to the Greeks probably shortly after the conquest by Alexander the Great (331 BC). According to the late classical philosopher Simplicius (early 6th century), Alexander ordered the translation of the historical astronomical records under supervision of his chronicler Callisthenes of Olynthus, who sent it to his uncle Aristotle. It is worth mentioning here that although Simplicius is a very late source, his account may be reliable. He spent some time in exile at the Sassanid (Persian) court, and may have accessed sources otherwise lost in the West. It is striking that he mentions the title tèresis (Greek: guard) which is an odd name for a historical work, but is in fact an adequate translation of the Babylonian title massartu meaning "guarding" but also "observing".  Anyway, Aristotle's pupil Callippus of Cyzicus introduced his 76-year cycle, which improved upon the 19-year Metonic cycle, about that time. He had the first year of his first cycle start at the summer solstice of 28 June 330 BC (Julian proleptic date), but later he seems to have counted lunar months from the first month after Alexander's decisive battle at Gaugamela in fall 331 BC.  So Callippus may have obtained his data from Babylonian sources and his calendar may have been anticipated by Kidinnu. Also it is known that the Babylonian priest known as Berossus wrote around 281 BC a book in Greek on the (rather mythological) history of Babylonia, the Babyloniaca, for the new ruler Antiochus I; it is said that later he founded a school of astrology on the Greek island of Kos. Another candidate for teaching the Greeks about Babylonian astronomy/astrology was Sudines who was at the court of Attalus I Soter late in the 3rd century BC. 

Historians have also found evidence that Athens during the late 5th century may have been aware of Babylonian astronomy. astronomers, or astronomical concepts and practices through the documentation by Xenophon of Socrates telling his students to study astronomy to the extent of being able to tell the time of night from the stars.  This skill is referenced in the poem of Aratos, which discusses telling the time of night from the zodiacal signs.

In any case, the translation of the astronomical records required profound knowledge of the cuneiform script, the language, and the procedures, so it seems likely that it was done by some unidentified Chaldeans. Now, the Babylonians dated their observations in their lunisolar calendar, in which months and years have varying lengths (29 or 30 days; 12 or 13 months respectively). At the time they did not use a regular calendar (such as based on the Metonic cycle like they did later), but started a new month based on observations of the New Moon. This made it very tedious to compute the time interval between events.

What Hipparchus may have done is transform these records to the Egyptian calendar, which uses a fixed year of always 365 days (consisting of 12 months of 30 days and 5 extra days): this makes computing time intervals much easier. Ptolemy dated all observations in this calendar. He also writes that "All that he (=Hipparchus) did was to make a compilation of the planetary observations arranged in a more useful way" (Almagest IX.2).  Pliny states (Naturalis Historia II.IX(53)) on eclipse predictions: "After their time (=Thales) the courses of both stars (=Sun and Moon) for 600 years were prophesied by Hipparchus,..."  This seems to imply that Hipparchus predicted eclipses for a period of 600 years, but considering the enormous amount of computation required, this is very unlikely. Rather, Hipparchus would have made a list of all eclipses from Nabonasser's time to his own.

See also
Babylonian astrology
Babylonian calendar
Babylonian mathematics
Babylonian star catalogues
Egyptian astronomy
History of astronomy (Section on Mesopotamia).
Mayan astronomy
MUL.APIN
Pleiades
Venus tablet of Ammisaduqa

Notes

References

Aaboe, Asger. Episodes from the Early History of Astronomy.  New York: Springer, 2001.  
Jones, Alexander. "The Adaptation of Babylonian Methods in Greek Numerical Astronomy." Isis, 82(1991): 441-453; reprinted in Michael Shank, ed. The Scientific Enterprise in Antiquity and the Middle Ages.  Chicago: Univ. of Chicago Pr., 2000.  
Kugler, F. X. Die Babylonische Mondrechnung ("The Babylonian lunar computation.") Freiburg im Breisgau, 1900.
Neugebauer, Otto. Astronomical Cuneiform Texts. 3 volumes. London:1956; 2nd edition, New York: Springer, 1983. (Commonly abbreviated as ACT).
Toomer, G. J. "Hipparchus and Babylonian Astronomy." In A Scientific Humanist: Studies in Memory of Abraham Sachs, ed. Erle Leichty, Maria deJ. Ellis, and Pamela Gerardi, pp. 353–362. Philadelphia: Occasional Publications of the Samuel Noah Kramer Fund 9, 1988.
 

Chaldea